Hækkerup is a surname. Notable people with the surname include:

Fie Hækkerup (born 1994), Danish politician
Hans Hækkerup (1945–2013), Danish politician
Karen Hækkerup (born 1974), Danish politician
Nick Hækkerup (born 1968), Danish writer and politician
Per Hækkerup (1915–1979), Danish politician

Danish-language surnames